Alla Ilchun (1926 – 8 March 1989) was a Chinese-born Kazakh-Russian fashion model. A muse for Christian Dior, who referred to her as "his personal talisman", she was the first prominent Asian woman to model European fashions.

Biography 
Ilchun was born in Harbin, China in 1926. Her father, Zhuanhal Ilchun, was a railway engineer from a wealthy family in Kazakhstan. Her mother, Tatyana, was a Russian opera singer and the daughter of a White Army officer. Due to political unrest in Harbin, with the city passing between the Chinese, Japanese, the Ilchun family fled to France. Her father was caught and sent to the Tokyo.

As a teenager, Ilchun worked as a dishwasher in a Parisian restaurant. During World War II, she joined the French Resistance.

Ilchun attended a model casting in Paris, as a favor to a friend, and was chosen by Christian Dior to work for the fashion house. She became a very successful model, and a muse for Dior, who referred to her as "his personal talisman". She was the first Asian model in the European fashion world.

While working as a model, she met the photographer Mike de Dülmen. The two married and had two children. She married a second time to Russian photographer Igor Mukhin.

After Dior's death, Ilchun worked closely with Yves Saint Laurent.

Legacy 
In 2020, a documentary film titled Alla – Dior’s Oriental Pearl was released.

References 

1926 births
1989 deaths
French Resistance members
Kazakhstani emigrants to France
Kazakhstani female models
Kazakhstani people of Russian descent
Muses
People from Harbin
Russian women in World War II